The Kingdom  is a story arc consisting of a two-issue, self-titled comic book limited series and multiple one-shot comics published by DC Comics in 1999. The story arc was written by Mark Waid and illustrated by Ariel Olivetti and Mike Zeck. It is both a sequel and, in some ways, a prequel (possibly sequel) to Kingdom Come, also by Mark Waid. Both books form an Elseworlds saga, as they are abstracted from official DC Comics continuity. The storyline extended into one-shot books entitled New Year's Evil: Gog, The Kingdom: Kid Flash, The Kingdom: Nightstar, The Kingdom: Offspring, The Kingdom:  Planet Krypton and The Kingdom: Son of the Bat. The entire storyline was later collected  into  a  trade   paperback.

Unlike "Kingdom Come," which features artwork by Alex Ross, "The Kingdom" has a different visual style. The story directly continues and expands upon the original storyline, exploring areas of the future that were not covered in the original miniseries. While "Kingdom Come" can stand alone, "The Kingdom" is a continuation and is not a complete story in itself.

Plot summary
Twenty years after the events of Kingdom Come, a man who survived the Kansas disaster is granted power by four members of the Quintessence, including Shazam, Ganthet, Zeus, and Izaya Highfather, and is dubbed Gog. However, the power drives him mad, and he takes his anger out on Superman, killing him multiple times by traveling back in time. The other four members of the Quintessence are prepared to let things unfold, hoping to achieve their own goals, but a shadowed figure who resembles the Phantom Stranger opposes Gog's actions. This figure plans to recruit his own agent to stop Gog, leading to a crisis.

As Gog travels closer to the modern DC Universe, the Linear Men panic when they see that their ordered index of time is unraveling. Rip Hunter is tasked with stopping Gog by the shadowed figure, and he recruits Superman, Batman, and Wonder Woman from the Kingdom Come era to help. Meanwhile, four young heroes-Kid Flash, Offspring, Nightstar, and Ibn al Xu'ffasch-try to stop Gog on their own and are eventually recruited to assist Rip Hunter's plan. During the battle, the future Wonder Woman reveals to the present Superman why Gog is after him. After defeating Gog, Hyperman reveals himself and explains that his infant self hid himself within the stream of Hypertime upon being rescued from Gog, and Rip Hunter explains the existence of timelines.

In Infinite Crisis, it is retroactively established that Superboy-Prime is responsible for the creation of Hypertime when he fractures the timeline from the pocket dimension he was trapped in.

Reaction

"The Kingdom" received mixed reviews upon its publication. Initially, the project was meant to be a prequel that would bridge the gap between the mainstream DC Universe and the one portrayed in "Kingdom Come." However, artist Alex Ross left the project, and writer Mark Waid revised the story into what was eventually published. Ross later criticized several aspects of the story in a Wizard magazine special, including the decision to make the birth of Superman and Wonder Woman's child a major world event (Ross believed they would keep it secret to give their child a normal life) and the fact that several characters that he intended to have been killed in the first series were alive in "The Kingdom," such as Zatara, Hawkman, and Kid Flash. However, no citation was provided for this criticism.

In addition to Ross's criticisms, "The Kingdom" was also criticized by some for its poor artwork. However, others praised the concept of Hypertime introduced in the story. Hypertime was a metaphor for reader response and canonicity, described in various ways as a river and tributaries of continuity, a geometric construct, and more. Despite its mixed reviews, "The Kingdom" has remained a significant part of the DC Universe, particularly due to its introduction of Hypertime and its impact on later storylines.

Publications

The various comics have been collected in a single trade paperback:

The Kingdom (232 page, 2000, Titan Books, DC Comics)

See also
List of Elseworlds publications

References

Elseworlds titles
Comics by Mark Waid
Comics about time travel
Comics about multiple time paths